King of the Beach is the third studio album by the American band Wavves. It was set to be released in the USA by Fat Possum Records and in the UK by Bella Union Records on August 3, 2010, but digital copies became available July 1 as a result of early leaks. Pitchfork placed it at number 50 on its list "The Top 50 Albums of 2010". Nathan Williams on Twitter has confirmed that most of the material from the album was originally demos that he had written with drummer Zach Hill of Hella and Death Grips.

Album cover
In interviews, Nathan Williams has stated that the album cover is a cartoon version of Snacks, his pet cat. A photo of Snacks was also featured on the cover of Best Coast's debut album, Crazy For You. Snacks died in February 2022, as confirmed on the band's Instagram page.

Track listing

 "Mickey Mouse" contains samples from "Da Doo Ron Ron" by The Crystals
 The Japanese CD replaces track 10 "Mickey Mouse" with "Mutant", and adds a bonus track "Stained Glass".

Charts
Album

As of 2011 it has sold 18,563 copies in United States according to Nielsen SoundScan.

Personnel
Nathan Williams - vocals, guitar, keyboards, additional percussion, drums on "When Will You Come".
Stephen Pope - bass, baritone guitar, synthesisers.
Billy Hayes - drums, keyboards, vocals on "Baby Say Goodbye".

References

External links
 Video of the group recording at Sweet Tea Studios

2010 albums
Wavves albums
Bella Union albums
Fat Possum Records albums
Albums produced by Dennis Herring